Espen Skistad (born 12 August 1972) is a retired Norwegian football goalkeeper.

He was a son of manager Brede Skistad. He came through the youth ranks of SK Nord, represented Norway as a youth international and was called up to Norway U21.

When commencing his senior career he joined IK Start where his father became manager. Following very limited playing time, he joined Strømsgodset on loan in 1995. In 1996 he went on a permanent transfer to Fyllingen, before moving home to Haugesund where he played for Nord and SK Vard Haugesund.

In 2008 he started a managing career, for SK Haugar's women. Ahead of the 2010 season he became manager for the men's team. He changed position to goalkeeping coach in 2011. In 2014 he was hired as such in FK Haugesund. In 2016 he took the UEFA A Licence for goalkeeper coaches.

Skistad has also played in a local band and been a football pundit for local radio.

References

1972 births
Living people
People from Karmøy
Norwegian footballers
IK Start players
Strømsgodset Toppfotball players
Fyllingen Fotball players
SK Vard Haugesund players
Eliteserien players
Norwegian First Division players
Association football goalkeepers
Norwegian football managers
FK Haugesund non-playing staff
Association football goalkeeping coaches
Sportspeople from Rogaland